The 2020 Davis Cup Qualifying Round was held on 6–7 March. The twelve winners of this round would qualify for the 2020 Davis Cup Finals while the twelve losers would qualify for the 2020 Davis Cup World Group I.

Teams
Twenty-four teams played for twelve spots in the Finals, in series decided on a home and away basis.

Twenty-six eligible teams are:
 14 teams ranked 5th-18th in the Finals.
 12 winning teams from their Group I zone.

The remaining 24 nations will compete for 12 spots in the Finals.

The 12 winning teams from the play-offs would play at the Finals and the 12 losing teams would play at the World Group I.

Seeded teams
 
 
 
 
 
 
 
 
 
 
 
 

Unseeded teams:

Results summary

Qualifying round results

Croatia vs. India

Hungary vs. Belgium

Colombia vs. Argentina

United States vs. Uzbekistan

Australia vs. Brazil

Italy vs. South Korea

Germany vs. Belarus

Kazakhstan vs. Netherlands

Slovakia vs. Czech Republic

Austria vs. Uruguay

Japan vs. Ecuador

Sweden vs. Chile

References

External links

Qualifying